The Six Chuter SR1 is an American powered parachute that was designed and produced by Six Chuter of Yakima, Washington.

Design and development
It features a parachute-style high-wing, single-place accommodation, tricycle landing gear and a single  Rotax 503 engine in pusher configuration. The  Rotax 582 engine was a factory option.

The aircraft is built from a combination of aluminium and 4130 steel tubing. In flight steering is accomplished via foot pedals that actuate the canopy brakes, creating roll and yaw. On the ground the aircraft has lever-controlled nosewheel steering. The aircraft was factory supplied in the form of an assembly kit that requires 40 hours to complete.

Specifications (SR1)

References

SR1
1990s United States ultralight aircraft
Single-engined pusher aircraft
Powered parachutes